The 54th Massachusetts Volunteer Regiment is a ceremonial unit of the Massachusetts Army National Guard. It takes its name from the famous 54th Massachusetts Volunteer Infantry.

History
The 54th assumes the history of the 54th Massachusetts Volunteer Infantry, which preceded it and which fought in the American Civil War, being at that time the second African-American regiment. The 54th was made famous through its representation in the 1989 film Glory.

The unit was formed on November 21, 2008, and designated the Massachusetts National Guard ceremonial unit, forming an honor guard at military funerals and other state functions. It was invited to march in President Barack Obama's inaugural parade.

References

Military units and formations in Massachusetts
Military units and formations established in 2008
54th